Parke Peak is located in the Livingston Range, Glacier National Park in the U.S. state of Montana. Harris Glacier is immediately northeast of Parke Peak. The mountain is named for John G. Parke (1827–1900), of the International Boundary Survey.

Climate
Based on the Köppen climate classification, the peak is located in an alpine subarctic climate zone with long, cold, snowy winters, and cool to warm summers. Temperatures can drop below −10 °F with wind chill factors below −30 °F.

See also
 List of mountains and mountain ranges of Glacier National Park (U.S.)

References

Livingston Range
Mountains of Flathead County, Montana
Mountains of Glacier National Park (U.S.)
Mountains of Montana